Philippe Benassaya (born 4 August 1964) is a French Republican politician who was elected Member of Parliament for Yvelines's 11th constituency in a by-election in 2020.

He lost his seat in the first round of the 2022 French legislative election.

References 

1964 births
Living people
The Republicans (France) politicians
Paris-Sorbonne University alumni
French essayists
Mayors of Yvelines
People from Pantin
21st-century French politicians
Deputies of the 15th National Assembly of the French Fifth Republic
French people of Algerian descent
Members of Parliament for Yvelines